Lees Camp or Lee's Camp may refer to:

Lee, California
Lees Camp, Oregon